Palomino is the ninth studio album by American country music singer Miranda Lambert, released through Vanner Records and RCA Records Nashville on April 29, 2022. Lambert produced the album alongside Luke Dick and Jon Randall and co-wrote 14 of the 15 tracks.  It was preceded by the single "If I Was a Cowboy". This is her last album with Sony Music Nashville.

The album was nominated for the Country Music Association Award for Album of the Year.

Background and writing
Lambert began writing the songs on her farm in Tennessee in 2020 with Luke Dick and Natalie Hemby. In 2021, Lambert collaborated with Jack Ingram and Jon Randall on the album The Marfa Tapes, on which "In His Arms", "Waxahachie" and "Geraldene" first appeared in a "stripped" acoustic form. The tracks were re-recorded for Palomino.
Lambert collaborated with the B-52's for "Music City Queen" and covered Mick Jagger's 1993 song "Wandering Spirit" for the album.

Promotion
"Strange" and "Actin' Up" were released ahead of the album as promotional singles. Lambert performed "Geraldine" at the 56th Annual Country Music Association Awards.

Critical reception

On review aggregator Metacritic, Palomino received a score of 83 out of 100 based on seven reviews, indicating "universal acclaim". In an early review, Jon Freeman of Rolling Stone gave Palomino four out of five stars, calling the album a "welcome departure" for Lambert. Will Hermes of Pitchfork gave the album a 7.6/10, stating that "Lambert's breadth is on full display".

Year-end lists

Commercial performance
Palomino debuted at number four on the US Billboard 200 with 36,000 album-equivalent units (including 24,000 album sales), making it the highest debut of 2022 for a country artist and the most units earned in the first week for a country album in 2022. It is Lambert's seventh top-10 album.

Track listing

Personnel

Musicians
Cary Barlowe – electric guitar
Sarah Buxton – background vocals
Luke Dick – acoustic guitar, bass guitar, electric guitar, ganjo, harmonica, keyboards, percussion, programming, steel guitar, background vocals, handclaps
Fred Eltringham – drums, percussion, handclaps
Ian Fitchuk – B-3 organ, bass guitar, Fender Rhodes, keyboards, percussion, piano
Kenny Greenberg – steel guitar
Natalie Hemby – background vocals
Miranda Lambert – lead vocals, background vocals
Jason Lehning – bass guitar, keyboards
Alfreda McCrary – background vocals 
Beverly McCrary – background vocals 
Regina McCrary – background vocals
Rob McNelley – acoustic guitar, electric guitar, handclaps
Al Perkins – pedal steel guitar
Kate Pierson – background vocals on "Music City Queen"
Jon Randall – acoustic guitar, mandolin, background vocals, handclaps
Mikey Reaves – bass guitar, electric guitar, programming
Fred Schneider – background vocals on "Music City Queen"
Jimmy Wallace – keyboards
Cindy Wilson – background vocals on "Music City Queen"
Craig Young – bass guitar, handclaps

Technical
Luke Dick – producer (all tracks)
Miranda Lambert – producer (all tracks)
Jon Randall – producer (all tracks)
Mikey Reaves – producer (track 11)
Jason Lehning – mixing engineer (all tracks)

Other
Alena Moran – production coordinator (all tracks)

Charts

Weekly charts

Year-end charts

References

2022 albums
Albums produced by Jon Randall
Miranda Lambert albums
RCA Records albums